Gakuen Alice is a 2004 Japanese anime television series based on the manga series of the same name by Tachibana Higuchi. Consisting of 26 episodes and one special, the series aired on NHK-BS2 between October 30, 2004 and May 14, 2005. The television series was produced by Group TAC under the direction of Takahiro Omori. Script composition was by Masashi Yokoyama while music composition was by Makoto Yoshimori.

Episode list

References 

Episodes
Gakuen Alice